Wes McCreary Rogers (born July 24, 1982) is a Democratic member of the Missouri General Assembly representing the 18th House district.

Career
Rogers won the November 2018 general election. He secured fifty-seven percent of the vote while his closest rival, Republican Sarah Mills, secured forty-three percent.

References

Rogers, Wes
Living people
21st-century American politicians
1982 births